The following highways are numbered 238:

Canada
 Manitoba Provincial Road 238
 Newfoundland and Labrador Route 238
 Prince Edward Island Route 238
 Quebec Route 238

Costa Rica
 National Route 238

Japan
 Japan National Route 238

United States
 Interstate 238
 Arizona State Route 238
 Arkansas Highway 238
 California State Route 238
 Georgia State Route 238 (former)
 Indiana State Road 238 (former)
 Iowa Highway 238 (former)
 K-238 (Kansas highway)
 Maine State Route 238
 Maryland Route 238
 Minnesota State Highway 238
 Montana Secondary Highway 238
 New Mexico State Road 238
 New York State Route 238
 Ohio State Route 238
 Oregon Route 238
 Pennsylvania Route 238
 Rhode Island Route 238
 South Dakota Highway 238
 Tennessee State Route 238
 Texas State Highway 238
 Utah State Route 238 (former)
 Virginia State Route 238
 Wyoming Highway 238
Territories
 Puerto Rico Highway 238